John Bentley may refer to:


Politics
John Bentley (MP) ( 1390), MP for Surrey
John Bentley (politician) (1822–1894), Wisconsin State Assemblyman
John A. Bentley (1836–1912), Wisconsin State Senator

Sports
John Bentley (cricketer) (1787–1859), English cricketer
John Bentley (football manager) (1860–1918), English football manager
John Bentley (rower) (born 1957), Australian Olympic rower
John Bentley (rugby) (born 1966), English dual-code international rugby footballer
John Edmund Bentley (1847–1913), English rugby international

Others
John Bentley (musician & office holder) ( 1756–1813), English-Canadian organist, choirmaster, harpsichordist and composer
John Bentley (Royal Navy officer) (died 1772), who gave his name to HMS Bentley (K465)
John Francis Bentley (1839–1902), English architect
John Irving Bentley (1874–1966), American physician and alleged victim of spontaneous human combustion
John Boyd Bentley (1896–1989), second bishop of the Episcopal Diocese of Alaska
John Bentley (actor) (1916–2009), British actor
John Bentley (musician) (born 1951), British bass guitarist for the UK band Squeeze

See also
The John Bentley School, Calne, Wiltshire, England
Jack Bentley (disambiguation)
Jon Bentley (disambiguation)